Union Pacific is a Western television series starring Jeff Morrow, Judson Pratt and Susan Cummings that aired in syndication from 1958 until 1959. This show was inspired by the 1939 film also named Union Pacific, starring Joel McCrea, Barbara Stanwyck, and Robert Preston.

The series follows the exploits of Bart McClelland, played by Morrow, as he supervises the construction and extension of the Union Pacific Railroad west of Omaha, Nebraska, to Promontory, northwest of Salt Lake City, Utah. McClelland was mostly concerned with right-of-way issues, which could be affected by stubborn landowners, ranchers, Indians, outlaws, and other factors. Helping McClelland with his work was surveyor Billy Kincaid, played by Pratt. Susan Cummings rounded out the cast as Georgia, proprietor of the Golden Nugget Saloon, the rolling bar that followed the railroad workers along the tracks. Union Pacific never developed a following and was cancelled after a single season.

Union Pacific was filmed by California National Productions at the Iverson Movie Ranch in Chatsworth in Los Angeles County, California. Other offerings were the syndicated Boots and Saddles and Pony Express (both 1957–1958) and the NBC anthology series, Frontier, which aired from 1955 to 1956.

External links

References
 McNeil, Alex. Total Television  (1996). New York: Penguin Books 
 Brooks, Tim and Marsh, Earle, The Complete Directory to Prime Time Network and Cable TV Shows (1999). New York: Ballantine Books 

1950s Western (genre) television series
First-run syndicated television programs in the United States
1958 American television series debuts
1959 American television series endings
Black-and-white American television shows
Television shows set in Nebraska
Television shows set in Colorado
Television shows set in Utah
English-language television shows